Homburger is a surname. Notable people with the surname include:

 Freddy Homburger (1916–2001), Swiss-born oncologist
 Henry Homburger (1902–1950), American bobsledder

See also
 Homburg (hat)
 Hamburger (disambiguation)